Elizabeth Azcona Cranwell (10 March 1933 – 2 December 2004) was an Argentine poet, storyteller, writer, translator, and literary critic. She was born and died in Buenos Aires, Argentina. She was on the faculty of Philosophy and Letters at the University of Buenos Aires. She was a teacher, teaching workshops and seminars. She was also a literary critic for the newspaper La Nación and a translator. She translated the poems of William Shand, the collected poems of Dylan Thomas, and the tales of Edgar Allan Poe.

Azcona Cranwell was the "poeta hermana" of Alejandra Pizarnik, and a contemporary of Joaquín Giannuzzi and Maria Elena Walsh. She was the 1984 Konex Award laureate.

Selected works
 1955 - "Capítulo sin presencia"
 1956 -  "La vida disgregada"
 1963 -  "Los riesgos y el vacío"
 1966 -  "De los opuestos"
 1971 -  "Imposibilidad del lenguaje o los nombres del amor"
 1971 -  "La vuelta de los equinoccios"
 1978 -  "Anunciación del mal y la inocencia"
 "El mandato"
 1987 -  "Las moradas del sol"
 1990 -  "El escriba de la mirada fija"
 "La mordedura"
 1997 - "El reino intermitente"

References

1933 births
2004 deaths
Argentine women poets
Argentine translators
Argentine literary critics
Argentine women critics
Women literary critics
Writers from Buenos Aires
University of Buenos Aires alumni
International Writing Program alumni
Burials at La Chacarita Cemetery
20th-century Argentine women writers
20th-century Argentine writers
20th-century poets
20th-century translators
English–Spanish translators
Women storytellers
Storytellers